The IIFA Best Dialogue is chosen by the viewers and the winner is announced at the ceremony.

Rajkumar Hirani and Abhijat Joshi hold the record for maximum wins with three awards followed by Juhi Chaturvedi with two.

The winners are listed below:

See also 
 IIFA Awards
 Bollywood
 Cinema of India

References

External links
 2008 winners 
 2007 IIFA winners

International Indian Film Academy Awards